Comments on the Peak of Eloquence may refer to:

 Comments on the Peak of Eloquence (Ibn Abu al-Hadid)
 Peak of Eloquence with comments (Muhammad Abduh)